Loop 12 station is a planned DART Light Rail station in Irving, Texas. The station is planned but deferred until surrounding development on the Texas Stadium site warrants construction.

References

External links 
Dallas Area Rapid Transit

Dallas Area Rapid Transit light rail stations
Proposed railway stations in the United States